The Shire of Toombul was a local government area of Queensland, Australia, located in northern Brisbane from 1883 to 1925.

History
The Nundah Division was one of the original divisions created on 11 November 1879 under the Divisional Boards Act of 1879.

The division was a large one, ranging from the Pine River in the north to the Brisbane River in the south and from Moreton Bay in the east to Chinaman's Creek (now South Pine River) in the west. The residents in the southern part of the division (the Toombul area) felt their needs were quite distinct from those further north and immediately began to agitate for the division to be split. On 1 November 1883, the Toombul Division was separated from the Nundah Division (which was later renamed the Kedron Division).

On 2 October 1890 the Hamilton Division was separated from the Toombul Division due to the agitation of Toombul board member Andrew Lang Petrie, who became the first chairman of the Hamilton board.

On 31 March 1903, the Local Authorities Act 1902 replaced Divisions with Shires and Towns, replacing Toombul Division with the Shire of Toombul.

The Shire of Toombul War Memorial was dedicated by the Governor of Queensland, Matthew Nathan, on 12 November 1921. The memorial commemorates who served in World War I. It is located in Nundah Memorial Park (then known as Buckland Park).

On 1 October 1925, the Shire of Toombul was amalgamated into the City of Brisbane.

Toombul Shire Hall

When the Toombul Division was established, it had offices situated at Breakfast Creek.  When the Hamilton Division separated in 1890, it took over the offices at Breakfast Creek, forcing the Toombul Divisional Board to rent premises in Boyd Street, Nundah.

The division erected a hall in 1891 at 1141 Sandgate Road, Nundah. It comprised offices at the front of the building and a public hall at the rear.

The Shire Hall was retained by the Brisbane City Council after amalgamation in 1925 and was used as for public health offices and as a works depot with the hall available for community meetings.

During World War 2, the building was by the ARP Civil Defence and the Nundah Auxiliary Ambulance. The Queensland Ambulance Transport Brigade offering first aid training in the building.

Following a $135,000 renovation in 1987–88 by the Brisbane City Council, the building has been re-opened solely for community use for functions and meetings.

The hall was listed on the Queensland Heritage Register on 21 October 1992.

Chairmen
The chairmen of the Shire of Toombul were:
 1883-1885: John Francis Buckland (also MLA for Bulimba)
 1886-1889: William Widdup
 1890-1891: Andrew Wagner
 1892: Isaac Stuckey
 1893: Georges Robert
 1894: William Widdup
 1895: Andrew Wagner
 1896: John Lancaster
 1897: John Chapman
 1898: Isaac Stuckey
 1899: Andrew Wagner
 1900: Samuel Unwin
 1901-1902: John Elliott
 1903: John Lancaster
 1904-1905: James Francis Maxwell (later Mayor of Brisbane and MLA for Toowong) 
 1906: George Morrison
 1907: Robert Westacott
 1908: David Wildermuth
 1909: William Price Cooksley
 1910: W. B. Robinson
 1911: David Wildermuth
 1912: William Price Cooksley
 1913: Oliver Collins
 1914: David Wildermuth
 1915: William Lionel Childs
 1916: John Lancaster
 1917-1918: Percy Charles Sapsford
 1919: James Peter Peterson
 1920-1925: Frederick William Bradbury

References

Further reading

External links
  
 

Former local government areas of Queensland
Toombul, Queensland
1925 disestablishments in Australia
1883 establishments in Australia
Nundah, Queensland